Aleksandr Vitalyevich Mikhaylov (born 21 May 2000) is a Russian football player. He plays for FC Dynamo Barnaul.

Club career
He made his debut in the Russian Professional Football League for FC Chertanovo Moscow on 30 May 2016 in a game against FC Lokomotiv Liski. He made his Russian Football National League debut for Chertanovo on 24 November 2018 in a game against FC Krasnodar-2.

References

External links
 

2000 births
People from Rubtsovsk
Sportspeople from Altai Krai
Living people
Russian footballers
Russia youth international footballers
Association football defenders
FC Chertanovo Moscow players
FC Veles Moscow players
FC Dynamo Barnaul players
Russian First League players
Russian Second League players